The Little River (or Nalong) is a perennial river of the Mitchell River catchment, located in the East Gippsland region of the Australian state of Victoria.

Course and features
The river descends  over its  course.

The Little River sub-catchment area is managed by the East Gippsland Catchment Management Authority.

The river is traversed by the Great Alpine Road near Ensay.

The Australian Aboriginal name for the river in the Dhudhuroa language is Nalong with no defined meaning.

See also

 List of rivers in Australia

References

External links
 
 
 

East Gippsland catchment
Rivers of Gippsland (region)